Bob Cope (November 6, 1936 – August 3, 1997) was an American football coach. In a 32-year career, he served as assistant coach at Vanderbilt, SMU, Arkansas, Ole Miss, Purdue, Pacific, USC, Baylor, and Kansas State. During his career, he coached 23 nationally ranked defenses and participated in eight bowl games.

A native of Chattanooga, Tennessee, he played college football at Carson–Newman College, and was induced posthumously into the Carson–Newman Athletic Hall of Fame in 2002.

Cope was an assistant coach at University of Pacific for Chester Caddas in the early 1970s. His only stint as head coach came at Pacific (1983–1988), where he had a 22–46 record.

Cope was diagnosed with cancer in September 1996. He died at Mercy Health Center in Manhattan, Kansas.

Head coaching record

References

1936 births
1997 deaths
Arkansas Razorbacks football coaches
Baylor Bears football coaches
Carson–Newman Eagles football players
Kansas State Wildcats football coaches
Ole Miss Rebels football coaches
Purdue Boilermakers football coaches
Pacific Tigers football coaches
SMU Mustangs football coaches
USC Trojans football coaches
Vanderbilt Commodores football coaches
People from Chattanooga, Tennessee
Players of American football from Tennessee
Deaths from cancer in Kansas